Fatty's Magic Pants is a 1914 American short comedy film directed by and starring Fatty Arbuckle. The film is also known as Fatty's Suitless Day.

Cast
 Roscoe "Fatty" Arbuckle - Fatty
 Charley Chase - Fatty's Rival
 Minta Durfee - The Girl
 Harry McCoy - Party Guest
 Bert Roach - Party Guest
 Al St. John - Party Guest
 Slim Summerville - Cop
 Glen Cavender

See also
 List of American films of 1914
 Fatty Arbuckle filmography

References

External links

1914 films
Films directed by Roscoe Arbuckle
1914 comedy films
1914 short films
American silent short films
American black-and-white films
Silent American comedy films
American comedy short films
1910s American films
1910s English-language films